Windy Cantika Aisah (born 11 June 2002) is an Indonesian weightlifter. She won the gold medal at the 2019 Southeast Asian Games and the bronze medal at the 2020 Summer Olympics in the women's 49 kg event.

Career 
Aisah made her debut at the Southeast Asian Games in 2019 Philippines, by competing in the women's 49 kg. She won the gold medal after lifting 190 kg in total.

In 2021, Aisah won a bronze for the snatch at the 2020 Asian Championships, and later she won the gold medal in her event at the 2021 Junior World Championships held in Tashkent, Uzbekistan. Aisah qualified to represent Indonesia at the 2020 Summer Olympics in Tokyo, Japan. She claimed the first medal for Indonesia at the 2020 Summer Olympics after winning the bronze medal in the women's 49 kg event with 194 kg lift in total.

She competed in the women's 49kg event at the 2022 World Weightlifting Championships held in Bogotá, Colombia.

Awards and nominations

Competition Results

References

External links 
 

2002 births
Living people
Sportspeople from Bandung
Indonesian female weightlifters
Weightlifters at the 2020 Summer Olympics
Olympic weightlifters of Indonesia
Olympic bronze medalists for Indonesia
Olympic medalists in weightlifting
Medalists at the 2020 Summer Olympics
Competitors at the 2019 Southeast Asian Games
Competitors at the 2021 Southeast Asian Games
Southeast Asian Games gold medalists for Indonesia
Southeast Asian Games medalists in weightlifting
21st-century Indonesian women